MKMCF Ma Chan Duen Hey Memorial College (MCDH), founded in 1998, a co-ed secondary school in  Sai Kung District. MCDH is located at 2 Wan Lung Road in Tseung Kwan O, Hong Kong. It is using Chinese as the medium of instruction in junior classes and some senior classes.

Organisation

Houses
Modest House
Caring House
Diligent House
Honest House

Student Union
2011-12 Dynamic SU
2010-11 USH SU
2009-10 Obama SU
2008-09 WiFi SU
2007-08 Tens SU
2006-07 Twinkle SU
2005-06 ? SU
2004-05 ? SU

School Hymn
M-C-D-H, Modest, Caring, Diligent, Honest and sharing.
We pray God's blessing on our school and grant. His grace and mercy rule.
A Christian core within our land. Strong under God's dear loving Hand.
M-C-D-H, M-C-D-H, God's strength empowers on our way.
God leads us to com-pass-ion true, Sharpens our vision fresh and new.
M-C-D-H, M-C-D-H, God's love, Our gift toward endless day.

Extra-curricular activities

Service Team
Prefect Team
Librarian
Scout Troop / Venture Scout Unit (1072 Nd East Kowloon Group)
Red Cross Youth Unit (Youth Unit 230)
Boys' Brigade (113th Company)
IT Prefect Team

External links
MKMCF Ma Chan Duen Hey Memorial Evening College (Chinese)

Secondary schools in Hong Kong
Sai Kung District